Franz Konrad (born 8 June 1951 in Graz, Austria) is a former race driver and founder of Konrad Motorsport in 1976.

As a driver, he won the 1983 German Formula Three Championship in an Anson SA4-Toyota.  In 1990, he took a career best 2nd in the 1990 24 Hours of Le Mans driving a Jaguar, then followed this with an overall victory in the 1993 24 Hours Nürburgring driving a Porsche 911. He was also one of the drivers of the class winning at the 24 Hours of Daytona in 1998 driving a Porsche GT2 Twin Turbo.

He was also constructor of the Konrad KM-011, a Group C sportscar using Lamborghini power.

Racing record

Complete World Sportscar Championship results
(key) (Races in bold indicate pole position) (Races in italics indicate fastest lap)

Footnotes

24 Hours of Le Mans results

Complete European Formula Two Championship results
(key) (Races in bold indicate pole position; races in italics indicate fastest lap)

Complete FIA GT Championship results
(key) (Races in bold indicate pole position) (Races in italics indicate fastest lap)

Complete WeatherTech SportsCar Championship results
(key) (Races in bold indicate pole position) (Races in italics indicate fastest lap)

References

External links
 Konrad Motorsport's official website
 Franz Konrad driver profile

1951 births
Living people
German racing drivers
European Formula Two Championship drivers
German Formula Three Championship drivers
24 Hours of Le Mans drivers
24 Hours of Daytona drivers
American Le Mans Series drivers
European Le Mans Series drivers
World Sportscar Championship drivers
WeatherTech SportsCar Championship drivers
24 Hours of Spa drivers
Sports car racing team owners
24H Series drivers
Porsche Motorsports drivers
Team Joest drivers
Nürburgring 24 Hours drivers
Lamborghini Super Trofeo drivers